Aslauga bouyeri is a butterfly in the family Lycaenidae. It is found in Cameroon and Tanzania.

Subspecies
Aslauga bouyeri bouyeri (central Cameroon)
Aslauga bouyeri congdoni Libert & Collins, 1997 (Tanzania)

References

External links
Images representing Aslauga bouyeri at Barcodes of Life

Butterflies described in 1994
Aslauga